Patricia S. Hu has been the Director of the U.S. Bureau of Transportation Statistics since 2011.  Previously she had been director of the Center for Transportation Analysis at Oak Ridge National Laboratory.

Career 
Hu received statistics degrees from the National Chengchi University and the University of Guelph.  She was chairman of the Transportation Research Board.

She worked as a biostatistician for Brookhaven National Laboratory, and then joined Oak Ridge National Laboratory (ORNL) in 1982.
She was director of ORNL's Center for Transportation Analysis for nine years, and co-authored many of its annual Summary of Travel Trends: Nationwide Personal Travel Survey bulletins, detailing household vehicle travel patterns and usage. In addition, she co-authored various journal articles investigating the relationship between aging and car crashes, and the different risk factors found among older male and female drivers.

Hu started at the Bureau of Transportation Statistics as Director in 2011. It is a civil service position. "Hu has led many applied research projects, published extensively, and received the TRB Pyke Johnson Award in 1984." She has also received the YMCA's Tribute to Women Award, and the Association for Women in Science Award.

As the Director of the BTS, Hu is working to increase the efficiency of the agency by better leveraging the sharing of big data, such as utilizing data from the Waze app to mine highway safety information in order to best position emergency vehicles to respond to accidents quickly and efficiently.

References

External links 
 Video interview with Patricia Hu and John Horsley about the United States' transportation infrastructure (Washington Journal, C-SPAN, December 9, 2011)

American civil servants
Living people
United States Department of Transportation officials
University of Guelph alumni
National Chengchi University alumni
Year of birth missing (living people)